Acid–base imbalance is an abnormality of the human body's normal balance of acids and bases that causes the plasma pH to deviate out of the normal range (7.35 to 7.45). In the fetus, the normal range differs based on which umbilical vessel is sampled (umbilical vein pH is normally 7.25 to 7.45; umbilical artery pH is normally 7.18 to 7.38). It can exist in varying levels of severity, some life-threatening.

Classification

An excess of acid is called acidosis or acidemia, while an excess in bases is called alkalosis or alkalemia. The process that causes the imbalance is classified based on the cause of the disturbance (respiratory or metabolic) and the direction of change in pH (acidosis or alkalosis). This yields the following four basic processes:

Mixed disorders
The presence of only one of the above derangements is called a simple acid–base disorder. In a mixed disorder, more than one is occurring at the same time. Mixed disorders may feature an acidosis and alkosis at the same time that partially counteract each other, or there can be two different conditions affecting the pH in the same direction. The phrase "mixed acidosis", for example, refers to metabolic acidosis in conjunction with respiratory acidosis. Any combination is possible, as metabolic acidosis and alkalosis can co exist together.

Calculation of imbalance
The traditional approach to the study of acid–base physiology has been the empirical approach. The main variants are the base excess approach and the bicarbonate approach. The quantitative approach introduced by Peter A Stewart in 1978 is newer.

Causes
There are numerous reasons that each of the four processes can occur (detailed in each article). Generally speaking, sources of acid gain include:
 Retention of carbon dioxide
 Production of nonvolatile acids from the metabolism of proteins and other organic molecules
 Loss of bicarbonate in feces or urine
 Intake of acids or acid precursors

Sources of acid loss include:
 Use of hydrogen ions in the metabolism of various organic anions
 Loss of acid in the vomitus or urine
 Gastric aspiration in hospital
 Severe diarrhea
 Carbon dioxide loss through hyperventilation

Compensation

The body's acid–base balance is tightly regulated. Several buffering agents exist which reversibly bind hydrogen ions and impede any change in pH. Extracellular buffers include bicarbonate and ammonia, while proteins and phosphate act as intracellular buffers. The bicarbonate buffering system is especially key, as carbon dioxide (CO2) can be shifted through carbonic acid (H2CO3) to hydrogen ions and bicarbonate (HCO3−) as shown below.
HCO_3^- + H+ <=> H2CO3 <=> CO2 + H2O

Acid–base imbalances that overcome the buffer system can be compensated in the short term by changing the rate of ventilation. This alters the concentration of carbon dioxide in the blood, shifting the above reaction according to Le Chatelier's principle, which in turn alters the pH. For instance, if the blood pH drops too low (acidemia), the body will compensate by increasing breathing, expelling CO2, and shifting the reaction above to the right such that fewer hydrogen ions are free–thus the pH will rise back to normal. For alkalemia, the opposite occurs.

The kidneys are slower to compensate, but renal physiology has several powerful mechanisms to control pH by the excretion of excess acid or base. In responses to acidosis, tubular cells reabsorb more bicarbonate from the tubular fluid, collecting duct cells secrete more hydrogen and generate more bicarbonate, and ammoniagenesis leads to increased formation of the NH3 buffer. In responses to alkalosis, the kidney may excrete more bicarbonate by decreasing hydrogen ion secretion from the tubular epithelial cells, and lowering rates of glutamine metabolism and ammonia excretion.

References

External links

 On-line text at AnaesthesiaMCQ.com
 
 Overview at kumc.edu
 Overview at mcgill.ca
 Stewart's original text at acidbase.org
 Overview at med.utah.edu
 Overview at anaesthetist.com
 Overview at anst.uu.se
 Tutorial at acid-base.com
 Online acid–base physiology text
 Diagnoses at lakesidepress.com
 Interpretation at nda.ox.ac.uk
 Acid Base Tutorial

Human homeostasis
Acid–base physiology
Acid–base disturbances
Equilibrium chemistry
Respiratory therapy